Nicolás García Jerez (28 January 1757 – 31 July 1825) was a Spanish bishop, who also served as a governor of Nicaragua, and played an important role in Nicaraguan independence.

He was appointed Bishop of Nicaragua in 1806, ordained in 1810, and held the position until his death in 1825.

Role in Nicaraguan independence

When independence movements began in Latin America, the Nicaraguan church was divided over political issues. The high ranking churches supported Spanish rulers, while low level priests supported priests. García Jerez decided to negotiate with pro-independence figures and proposed elections for each barrios. The elections were supposed to clear the way for forming a junta. Most priests were under his control. However, in 1811, he declared himself the governor of Nicaragua and threatened to punish rebellion by death penalty, when the movement began to lose favor.

See also

 History of Nicaragua

References

External links and additional sources
 (for Chronology of Bishops)
 (for Chronology of Bishops)

1825 deaths
People from León, Nicaragua
1756 births
Spanish Roman Catholic bishops in North America
19th-century Roman Catholic bishops in Nicaragua
Roman Catholic bishops of León in Nicaragua